Numangatini Tione Ariki (b?–d?), commonly known as King John, was a sovereign of the Cook Islands. He was ariki (king) of the Numangatini dynasty, a chiefdom on the island of Mangaia.

Early life
Tione (also known as John) was a son of  Numangatini Ariki. Before Missionaries had arrived on the island, his father was married to a Mangaian woman and had a son named Tavita. After the event of Christianity Numangatini married a Rarotongan woman in a church wedding ceremony. The name Tavita is not Mangaian, it is coined from the biblical name David which would imply that he was born after the arrival of Christianity. Mangaian naming events are similar to First Nations people.

Succession
The Missionaries didn't recognize Tavita as rightful heir, on the excuse that he was not born in church wedlock. The opposition opposed Tione as heir, on the grounds that he was part Rarotongan. Tavita, however, died before his father. On the death of Numangatini, in 1878, a district chief installed No'oroa as ariki on the grounds that he was of senior descent, and full Mangaian.

The seat of Numangatini was made ready for No'oroa, but Miringatangi, a bigotted Church judge, as described by Frederick Moss, placed another chair besides that of No'oroa, his excuse was that Tione was the older man and an uncle and felt sorry for him. When No'oroa was installed in his seat, Tione was sitting beside him. Thus a double-arikiship was created. Both ruled, but Tione being the older and more dominant person wielded the greater influence.

Visit to London
King John paid Her Majesty Queen Victoria a visit in London. After his audience at Buckingham Palace he was careful to walk backwards and so continue facing the Queen.  Victoria was so impressed at his courtesy that she presented him with a Union Flag with her picture on it, and told him that Mangaia would from that day forward forever be part of Great Britain.

Gallery

See also
History of the Cook Islands
House of Ariki
List of current constituent monarchs

Sources
Mangaia and the mission by Peter Henry Buck, Teaea Parima edited by Teaea Parima 
The Right Hon. R. J. Seddon's (the premier of New Zealand) visit to Tonga, Fiji, Savage Island and the Cook Islands (J. Mackay, 1900)

External links

The Genealogy of the Kings of Rarotonga and Mangaia as illustrating the colonisation of that island and the Hervey Group
Mangaia: Oldest island in the Pacific

People from Mangaia
Mangaian monarchs
Royalty of the Cook Islands
19th-century monarchs in Oceania